In mathematics, a Hermitian symmetric space is a Hermitian manifold which at every point has an inversion symmetry preserving the Hermitian structure. First studied by Élie Cartan, they form a natural generalization of the notion of Riemannian symmetric space from real manifolds to complex manifolds.

Every Hermitian symmetric space is a homogeneous space for its isometry group and has a unique decomposition as a product of irreducible spaces and a Euclidean space. The irreducible spaces arise in pairs as a non-compact space that, as Borel showed, can be embedded as an open subspace of its compact dual space. Harish Chandra showed that each non-compact space can be realized as a bounded symmetric domain in a complex vector space. The simplest case involves the groups SU(2), SU(1,1) and their common complexification SL(2,C). In this case the non-compact space is the unit disk, a homogeneous space for SU(1,1). It is a bounded domain in the complex plane C. The one-point compactification of C, the Riemann sphere, is the dual space, a homogeneous space for SU(2) and SL(2,C).

Irreducible compact Hermitian symmetric spaces are exactly the homogeneous spaces of simple compact Lie groups by maximal closed connected subgroups which contain a maximal torus and have center isomorphic to the circle group.  There is a complete classification of irreducible spaces, with four classical series, studied by Cartan, and two exceptional cases; the classification can be deduced from Borel–de Siebenthal theory, which classifies closed connected subgroups containing a maximal torus. Hermitian symmetric spaces appear in the theory of Jordan triple systems, several complex variables, complex geometry, automorphic forms and group representations, in particular permitting the construction of the holomorphic discrete series representations of semisimple Lie groups.

Hermitian symmetric spaces of compact type

Definition
Let H be a connected compact semisimple Lie group, σ an automorphism of H of order 2 and Hσ the fixed point subgroup of σ.  Let K be a closed subgroup of H lying between Hσ and its identity component. The compact homogeneous space H / K is called a symmetric space of compact type. The Lie algebra  admits a decomposition

where , the Lie algebra of K, is the +1 eigenspace of σ and  the –1 eigenspace.

A canonical example is given by minus the Killing form. H / K is then a Riemannian symmetric space of compact type.

The symmetric space H / K is called a Hermitian symmetric space if it has an almost complex structure preserving the Riemannian metric.

Symmetry and center of isotropy subgroup
If (σ) is Hermitian, K has non-trivial center and the symmetry σ is inner, implemented by an element of the center of K.

Replacing A and B by JA and JB, it follows that

Since  is semisimple, δ must be an inner derivation, so that

The symmetry σ is implemented by z = exp πT and the almost complex structure by exp π/2 T.

The innerness of σ implies that K contains a maximal torus of H, so has maximal rank. On the other hand, the centralizer of the subgroup generated by the torus S of elements exp tT is connected, since if x is any element in K there is a maximal torus containing x and S,  which lies in the centralizer. On the other hand, it contains K since S is central in K and is contained in K since z lies in S. So K is the centralizer of S and hence connected. In particular K contains the center of H.

Irreducible decomposition

In fact there is a one-one correspondence between intermediate subalgebras  and K-invariant subspaces 
 of  given by

Any orthogonal symmetric algebra  (σ) of Hermitian type can be decomposed as an (orthogonal) direct sum of irreducible orthogonal symmetric algebras of Hermitian type.

In fact  can be written as a direct sum of simple algebras

each of which is left invariant by the automorphism σ and the complex structure J, since they are both inner.

This decomposition of the orthogonal symmetric Lie algebra yields a direct product decomposition of the corresponding compact symmetric space H / K when H is simply connected. In this case the fixed point subgroup Hσ is automatically connected. For simply connected H, the symmetric space H / K is the direct product of Hi / Ki with Hi simply connected and simple. Since each H is simply connected and K connected, the quotient H/K is simply connected.

Complex structure

if H / K is irreducible with K non-semisimple, the compact group H must be simple and K of maximal rank. From Borel-de Siebenthal theory, the involution σ is inner and K is the centralizer of its center, which is isomorphic to T. In particular K is connected. It follows that H / K is simply connected and there is a parabolic subgroup P in the complexification G of H such that H / K = G / P. In particular there is a complex structure on H / K and the action of H is holomorphic. Since any Hermitian symmetric space is a product of irreducible spaces, the same is true in general.

At the Lie algebra level, there is a symmetric decomposition

where  is a real vector space with a complex structure J, whose complex dimension is given in the table. Correspondingly, there is a graded Lie algebra decomposition

The Lie algebra of P is the semidirect product . The complex Lie algebras   are Abelian.

The realization of H/K as a generalized flag variety G/P is obtained by taking G as in the table (the complexification of H) and P to be the parabolic subgroup equal to the semidirect product of L, the complexification of K, with the complex Abelian subgroup exp . (In the language of algebraic groups,  L is the Levi factor of P.)

Classification
Any Hermitian symmetric space of compact type is simply connected and can be written as a direct product of irreducible hermitian symmetric spaces Hi / Ki with Hi simple, Ki connected of maximal rank with center T. The irreducible ones are therefore exactly the non-semisimple cases classified by Borel–de Siebenthal theory.
 
Accordingly, the irreducible compact Hermitian symmetric spaces H/K are classified as follows.

In terms of the classification of compact Riemannian symmetric spaces, the Hermitian symmetric spaces are the four infinite series AIII, DIII, CI and BDI with p = 2 or q = 2, and two exceptional spaces, namely EIII and EVII.

Classical examples
The irreducible Hermitian symmetric spaces of compact type are all simply connected. The corresponding symmetry σ of the simply connected simple compact Lie group is inner, given by conjugation by the unique element S in Z(K) / Z(H) of period 2. For the classical groups, as in the table above, these symmetries are as follows:

AIII:  in S(U(p)×U(q)), where αp+q=(−1)p.
CI: S=iI in U(n) ⊂ Sp(n) = Sp(n,C) ∩ U(2n); this choice is equivalent to Jn.
BDI:  in SO(p)×SO(2).

The maximal parabolic subgroup P can be described explicitly in these classical cases. For AIII

in SL(p+q,C). P(p,q) is the stabilizer of a subspace of dimension p in Cp+q.

The other groups arise as fixed points of involutions. Let J be the n × n matrix with 1's on the antidiagonal and 0's elsewhere and set

Then Sp(n,C) is the fixed point subgroup of the involution θ(g) = A (gt)−1 A−1 of SL(2n,C). SO(n,C) can be realised as the fixed points of ψ(g) = B (gt)−1 B−1 in SL(n,C) where B = J. These involutions leave invariant P(n,n) in the cases DIII and CI and P(p,2) in the case BDI. The corresponding parabolic subgroups P are obtained by taking the fixed points. The compact group H acts transitively on G / P, so that G / P = H / K.

Hermitian symmetric spaces of noncompact type

Definition
As with symmetric spaces in general, each compact Hermitian symmetric space H/K has a noncompact dual H*/K obtained by replacing H with the closed real Lie subgroup H* of the complex Lie group G with Lie algebra

Borel embedding
Whereas the natural map from H/K to G/P is an isomorphism, the natural map from H*/K to G/P is only an inclusion onto an open subset. This inclusion is called the Borel embedding after Armand Borel. In fact P ∩ H = K = P ∩ H*. The images of H and H* have the same dimension so are open. Since the image of H is compact, so closed, it follows that H/K = G/P.

Cartan decomposition
The polar decomposition in the complex linear group G implies the Cartan decomposition H* = K ⋅ exp  in H*.

Morevoer if A* = exp , then

These results are special cases of the Cartan decomposition in any Riemannian symmetric space and its dual. Similar results hold for in the compact case: H= K ⋅ exp  and H = KAK.

The properties of the totally geodesic subspace A can be shown directly. In the K-orbit of any element of  there is an element Y such that (X,Ad k Y) is minimized at k = 1.

The decompositions

can be proved directly by applying the slice theorem for compact transformation groups to the action of K on H / K. In fact the space H / K can be identified with

a closed submanifold of H, and the Cartan decomposition follows by showing that M is the union of the kAk−1 for k in K. Since this union is the continuous image of K × A, it is compact and connected. So it suffices to show that the union is open in M and for this it is enough to show each a in A has an open neighbourhood in this union. Now by computing derivatives at 0, the union contains an open neighbourhood of 1. If a is central the union is invariant under multiplication by a, so contains an open neighbourhood of a. By an Euler–Poincaré characteristic argument it follows that the superdimension of  coincides with the superdimension of the kernel of τ. In other words,

Here the terms a eY lie in the union by the argument for central a: indeed a is in the center of the identity component of the centralizer of a which is invariant under σ and contains A.

Strongly orthogonal roots

The roots with root spaces in  
(This terminology originates from the symmetric space of noncompact type.) If H is simple, the generator Z of the centre of K can be used to define a set of positive roots, according to the sign of α(Z). Root vectors Eα can be chosen so that

The simple roots α1, ...., αn are the indecomposable positive roots. Thus α1 is the unique noncompact simple root and the other simple roots are compact. Any positive noncompact root then has the form β = α1 + c2 α2 + ⋅⋅⋅ +  cn αn with non-negative coefficients ci. These coefficients lead to a lexicographic order on positive roots. The coefficient of α1 is always one because  is irreducible for K so is spanned by vectors obtained by successively applying the lowering operators E–α for simple compact roots α.

Two roots α and β are said to be strongly orthogonal if  ±α ±β are not roots or zero, written  α ≐ β. The highest positive root ψ1 is noncompact. Take ψ2 to be the highest noncompact positive root strongly orthogonal to ψ1 (for the lexicographic order). Then continue in this way taking ψi + 1 to be the highest noncompact positive root strongly orthogonal to ψ1, ..., ψi until the process terminates. The corresponding vectors

Their span  is Harish-Chandra's canonical maximal Abelian subalgebra. (As Sugiura later showed, having fixed T, the set of strongly orthogonal roots is uniquely determined up to applying an element in the Weyl group of K.)

Maximality can be checked by showing that if

for all i, then cα = 0 for all positive noncompact roots α  different from the ψj's. This follows by showing inductively that if cα ≠ 0, then α is strongly orthogonal to ψ1, ψ2, ... a contradiction. Indeed, the above relation shows ψi + α cannot be a root; and that if ψi – α is a root, then it would necessarily have the form β – ψi. If ψi – α were negative, then α would be a higher positive root than  ψi, strongly orthogonal to the ψj with j < i, which is not possible; similarly if  β – ψi were positive.

Polysphere and polydisk theorem
Harish-Chandra's canonical choice of  leads to a polydisk and polysphere theorem in H*/K and H/K. This result reduces the geometry to products of the prototypic example  involving SL(2,C), SU(1,1) and SU(2), namely the unit disk inside the Riemann sphere.

In the case of H = SU(2) the symmetry σ is given by conjugation by the diagonal matrix with entries ±i so that

The fixed point subgroup is the maximal torus T, the diagonal matrices with entries e ±it. SU(2) acts on the Riemann sphere  transitively by Möbius transformations and T is the stabilizer of 0. SL(2,C), the complexification of SU(2), also acts by Möbius transformations and the stabiliser of 0 is the subgroup B of lower triangular matrices. The noncompact subgroup SU(1,1) acts with precisely three orbits: the open unit disk |z| < 1; the unit circle z = 1; and its exterior |z| > 1. Thus

where B+  and TC denote the subgroups of upper triangular and diagonal matrices in SL(2,C). The middle term is the orbit of 0 under the upper unitriangular matrices

Now for each root ψi there is a homomorphism of πi of SU(2) into H which is compatible with the symmetries. It extends uniquely to a homomorphism of SL(2,C) into G. The images of the Lie algebras for different ψi's commute since they are strongly orthogonal. Thus there is a homomorphism π of the direct product SU(2)r into H compatible with the symmetries. It extends to a homomorphism of SL(2,C)r into G. The kernel of π is contained in the center (±1)r of SU(2)r which is fixed pointwise by the symmetry. So the image of the center under π lies in K. Thus there is an embedding of the polysphere (SU(2)/T)r into H / K = G / P and the polysphere contains the polydisk (SU(1,1)/T)r. The polysphere and polydisk are the direct product of r copies of the Riemann sphere and the unit disk. By the Cartan decompositions in SU(2) and SU(1,1), 
the polysphere is the orbit of TrA in H / K and the polydisk is the orbit of TrA*, where Tr = π(Tr) ⊆ K. On the other hand, H = KAK and H* = K A* K.

Hence every element in the compact Hermitian symmetric space H / K is in the K-orbit of a point in the polysphere; and every element in the image  under the Borel embedding of the noncompact Hermitian symmetric space H* / K is in the K-orbit of a point in the polydisk.

Harish-Chandra embedding
This is the Harish-Chandra embedding named after Harish-Chandra. 
 
In fact Harish-Chandra showed the following properties of the space :

 As a space, X is the direct product of the three factors.
 X is open in G.
 X is dense in G.
 X contains H*.
 The closure of H* / K in X / P =  is compact.

In fact  are complex Abelian groups normalised by KC. Moreover,  since .

This implies P ∩ M+ = {1}. For if x = eX with X in 
 lies in P, it must normalize M− and hence .

But if X commutes with every noncompact root space, it must be 0, so x = 1. It follows that the multiplication map μ on M+ × P is injective so (1) follows. Similarly the derivative of μ at (x,p) is

which is injective, so (2) follows. For the special case H = SU(2), H* = SU(1,1) and G = SL(2,C) the remaining assertions are consequences of the identification with the Riemann sphere, C and unit disk. They can be applied to the groups defined for each root ψi. By the polysphere and polydisk theorem H*/K, X/P and H/K are the union of the K-translates of the polydisk, Cr and the polysphere. So H* lies in X, the closure of H*/K is compact in X/P, which is in turn dense in H/K.

Note that (2) and (3) are also consequences of the fact that the image of X in G/P is that of the big cell B+B in the Gauss decomposition of G.

Using results on the restricted root system of the symmetric spaces H/K and H*/K, 
In fact it is the convex set of X for which the operator norm of ad Im X is less than one.

Bounded symmetric domains
A bounded domain Ω in a complex vector space is said to be a bounded symmetric domain if for every x in Ω, there is an involutive biholomorphism σx of Ω for which x is an isolated fixed point. The Harish-Chandra embedding exhibits every Hermitian symmetric space of noncompact type H* / K as a bounded symmetric domain. The biholomorphism group of H* / K is equal to its isometry group H*.

Conversely every bounded symmetric domain arises in this way. Indeed, given a bounded symmetric domain Ω, the Bergman kernel defines a metric on Ω, the Bergman metric, for which every biholomorphism is an isometry. This realizes Ω as a Hermitian symmetric space of noncompact type.

Classification
The irreducible bounded symmetric domains are called Cartan domains and are classified as follows.

Classical domains
In the classical cases (I–IV), the noncompact group can be realized by 2 × 2 block matrices

acting by generalized Möbius transformations

The polydisk theorem takes the following concrete form in the classical cases:
 Type Ipq (p ≤ q): for every p × q matrix M there are unitary matrices such that UMV is diagonal. In fact this follows from the polar decomposition for p × p matrices.
 Type IIIn: for every complex symmetric n × n matrix M there is a unitary matrix U such that UMUt is diagonal. This is proved by a classical argument of Siegel. Take V unitary so that V*M*MV is diagonal. Then VtMV is symmetric and its real and imaginary parts commute. Since they are real symmetric matrices they can be simultaneously diagonalized by a real orthogonal matrix W. So UMUt is diagonal if U = WVt.
 Type IIn: for every complex skew symmetric n × n matrix M there is a unitary matrix such that UMUt is made up of diagonal blocks  and one zero if n is odd. As in Siegel's argument, this can be reduced to case where the real and imaginary parts of M commute. Any real skew-symmetric matrix can be reduced to the given canonical form by an orthogonal matrix and this can be done simultaneously for commuting matrices.
 Type IVn: by a transformation in SO(n) × SO(2) any vector can be transformed so that all but the first two coordinates are non-zero.

Boundary components
The noncompact group H* acts on the complex Hermitian symmetric space H/K = G/P with only finitely many orbits. In particular the closure of the bounded domain H*/K has a unique closed orbit, which is the Shilov boundary of the domain. In general the orbits are unions of Hermitian symmetric spaces of lower dimension. The closure of the bounded domain is the Baily–Borel compactification of H*/K.

The boundary structure can be described using Cayley transforms. For each copy of SU(2) defined by one of the noncompact roots ψi, there is a Cayley transform ci which as a Möbius transformation maps the unit disk onto the upper half plane. Given a subset I of indices of the strongly orthogonal family ψ1, ..., ψr, the partial Cayley transform cI is defined as the product of the ci's with i in I in the product of the groups πi. Let G(I) be the centralizer of this product in G and H*(I) = H* ∩ G(I). Since σ leaves H*(I) invariant, there is a corresponding Hermitian symmetric space MI H*(I)/H*(I)∩K ⊂ H*/K = M . The boundary component for the subset I is the union of the K-translates of cI MI. When I is the set of all indices, MI is a single point and the boundary component is the Shilov boundary. Moreover, MI is in the closure of MJ if and only if I ⊇ J.

Geometric properties
Every Hermitian symmetric space is a Kähler manifold. They can be defined equivalently as Riemannian symmetric spaces with a parallel complex structure with respect to which the Riemannian metric is Hermitian. The complex structure is automatically preserved by the isometry group H of the metric, and so any Hermitian symmetric space M is a homogeneous complex manifold. Some examples are complex vector spaces and complex projective spaces, with their usual Hermitian metrics and Fubini–Study metrics, and the complex unit balls with suitable metrics so that they become complete and Riemannian symmetric. The compact Hermitian symmetric spaces are projective varieties, and admit a strictly larger Lie group G of biholomorphisms with respect to which they are homogeneous: in fact, they are generalized flag manifolds, i.e., G is semisimple and the stabilizer of a point is a parabolic subgroup P of G. Among (complex) generalized flag manifolds G/P, they are characterized as those for which the nilradical of the Lie algebra of P is abelian. Thus they are contained within the family of symmetric R-spaces which conversely comprises Hermitian symmetric spaces and their real forms. The non-compact Hermitian symmetric spaces can be realized as bounded domains in complex vector spaces.

Jordan algebras

Although the classical Hermitian symmetric spaces can be constructed by ad hoc methods, Jordan triple systems, or equivalently Jordan pairs, provide a uniform algebraic means of describing all the basic properties connected with a Hermitian symmetric space of compact type and its non-compact dual. The development is in the reverse order from that using the structure theory of compact Lie groups. It starting point is the Hermitian symmetric space of noncompact type realized as a bounded symmetric domain. It can be described in terms of a Jordan pair or hermitian Jordan triple system. This Jordan algebra structure can be used to reconstruct the dual Hermitian symmetric space of compact type, including in particular all the associated Lie algebras and Lie groups.

The theory is easiest to describe when the irreducible compact Hermitian symmetric space is of tube type. In that case the space is determined by a simple real Lie algebra 
with negative definite Killing form. It must admit an action of SU(2) which only acts via the trivial and adjoint representation, both types occurring. The complexification of  decomposes as a direct sum of three eigenspaces for the diagonal matrices in SU(2). It is a three-graded complex Lie algebra, with the Weyl group element of SU(2) providing the involution. Each of the ±1 eigenspaces has the structure of a unital complex Jordan algebra explicitly arising as the complexification of a Euclidean Jordan algebra.

The description of irreducible Hermitian symmetric spaces of tube type starts from a simple Euclidean Jordan algebra E. It admits Jordan frames, i.e. sets of orthogonal minimal idempotents e1, ..., em. Any two are related by an automorphism of E, so that the integer m is an invariant called the rank of E. Moreover, if A is the complexification of E, it has a unitary structure group. The spectral norm is defined by ||a|| = sup αi. The associated bounded symmetric domain is just the open unit ball D in A. There is a biholomorphism between D and the tube domain T = E + iC where C is the open self-dual convex cone of elements in E of the form  with u an automorphism of E and αi > 0. This gives two descriptions of the Hermitian symmetric space of noncompact type. There is a natural way of using mutations of the Jordan algebra A to compactify the space A. The compactification X is a complex manifold and the finite-dimensional Lie algebra  of holomorphic vector fields on X can be determined explicitly. One parameter groups of biholomorphisms can be defined such that the corresponding holomorphic vector fields span . This includes the group of all complex Möbius transformations corresponding to matrices in SL(2,C). The subgroup SU(1,1) leaves invariant the unit ball and its closure. The subgroup SL(2,R) leaves invariant the tube domain and its closure. The usual Cayley transform and its inverse, mapping the unit disk in C to the upper half plane, establishes analogous maps between D and T. The polydisk corresponds to the real and complex Jordan subalgebras generated by a fixed Jordan frame. The subgroup generated by the identity component K of the unitary structure group and the operators in SU(2)m. It defines a compact Lie group H which acts transitively on X. Thus H / K is the corresponding Hermitian symmetric space of compact type. The group G can be identified with the complexification of H. The subgroup H* leaving D invariant is a  noncompact real form of G. It acts transitively on D so that H* / K is the dual Hermitian symmetric space of noncompact type. The inclusions D ⊂ A ⊂ X reproduce the Borel and Harish-Chandra embeddings. The classification of Hermitian symmetric spaces of tube type reduces to that of simple Euclidean Jordan algebras.

In general a Hermitian symmetric space gives rise to a 3-graded Lie algebra with a period 2 conjugate linear automorphism switching the parts of degree ±1 and preserving the degree 0 part. This gives rise to the structure of a Jordan pair or hermitian Jordan triple system, to which  extended the theory of Jordan algebras. All irreducible Hermitian symmetric spaces can be constructed uniformly within this framework.  constructed the irreducible Hermitian symmetric space of non-tube type from a simple Euclidean Jordan algebra together with a period 2 automorphism. The −1 eigenspace of the automorphism has the structure of a Jordan pair, which can be deduced from that of the larger Jordan algebra. In the non-tube type case corresponding to a Siegel domain of type II, there is no distinguished subgroup of real or complex Möbius transformations.

See also
Invariant convex cone

Notes

References

  The standard book on Riemannian symmetric spaces.
 

  
 

 . Chapter 8 contains a self-contained account of Hermitian symmetric spaces of compact type.
. This contains a detailed account of Hermitian symmetric spaces of noncompact type.

Differential geometry
Complex manifolds
Riemannian geometry
Lie groups
Homogeneous spaces